The following is a list of Teen Choice Award winners and nominees for Choice Movie Scene Stealer. Formally awarded as two separate categories from 2010 to 2012: Choice Movie Male Scene Stealer and Choice Movie Female Scene Stealer.

Winners and nominees

2010s

Notes

References

Scene Stealer